Terry Luttrell (born 1947 Champaign, Illinois) is an American rock singer/musician best known as lead vocalist for both REO Speedwagon (1968–1972) and Starcastle (1973–1979).

Bands 
Luttrell had played guitar with a local Champaign band, Terry Cook and the Majestics, in the early to mid-1960s.

In 1968, Terry joined REO Speedwagon, replacing Mike Blair on vocals, at the University of Illinois. He sang on the band's debut album, which was released in October 1971 on Epic Records. Personal differences between Luttrell and REO Speedwagon's lead guitarist, Gary Richrath, led to Luttrell leaving the band in 1972. He was replaced by Kevin Cronin before the recording of the second album, R.E.O./T.W.O. Although not given credit, Luttrell claims he co-wrote the song Golden Country with Gary Richrath. 

Luttrell would go on to sing for the progressive band Starcastle on the albums Starcastle, Fountains of Light, Citadel, and Reel to Real, before the band folded in the late 1970s. He became a born-again Christian. Luttrell has participated peripherally in some Starcastle reunion projects, and can be heard on a few tracks from their 2007 album Song of Times. He helped produce some songs on an album for the country band South Of Georgia. He worked on some personal projects for himself and his daughter, Kristin. Kristin and her husband Dylan are the country music duo Dry Creek Station.

After a period of inactivity during which he became a FedEx driver, Luttrell returned to music as the lead vocalist for Champaign, Illinois-based band "Tons O' Fun."

Discography

REO Speedwagon
REO Speedwagon (1971)

Starcastle
Starcastle (1976)
Fountains of Light (1977)
Citadel (1978)
Real to Reel (1979)

References

1947 births
Living people
Musicians from Champaign, Illinois
American rock singers
REO Speedwagon members